Al-Susah is a Syrian town located in Abu Kamal District, Deir ez-Zor. According to the Syria Central Bureau of Statistics (CBS), Al-Susah had a population of 8,797 in the 2004 census.

Climate

Islamic State of Iraq and the Levant
Al-Susah was one  of the last holdouts of ISIS in Syria. On January 15, 2019 Syrian Democratic Forces fully captured the town.

References 

Populated places in Deir ez-Zor Governorate
Populated places on the Euphrates River